is a passenger railway station located in Naka-ku, in the city of Okayama, Okayama Prefecture, Japan. It is operated by West Japan Railway Company (JR West). The station is on the border between Naka-ku and Higashi-ku, and part of Platform 1 extends into Higashi-ku.

Lines
Higashi-Okayama Station is served by the San'yō Main Line an is 136.1 km from the starting of the Sanyo Main Line at Kōbe Station.

Layout
The station has two side platforms and one island platform, serving a total of four tracks, connected by footbridges. The station is staffed.

Platforms

History
Higashi-Okayama Station opened on 18 March 1891, initially named . It was renamed  on 1 January 1906, becoming Higashi-Okayama from 20 March 1961.

With the privatization of Japanese National Railways (JNR) on 1 April 1987, the station came under the control of JR West.

Passenger statistics
In fiscal 2019, the station was used by an average of 3974 passengers daily

Surrounding area
 
 International Pacific University No. 2 campus
 Higashi Okayama Technical High School
 Okayama Prefectural Okayama School for the Deaf

See also
 List of railway stations in Japan

References

External links

  

Stations of West Japan Railway Company
Railway stations in Okayama
Sanyō Main Line
Akō Line
Railway stations in Japan opened in 1891